Mary Forbes (born Ethel Louise Young; 1 January 1883 – 22 July 1974) was a British-American film actress, based in the United States in her latter years, where she died. She appeared in more than 130 films between 1919 and 1958. Forbes was born in Hornsey, England.

She made her first public appearance on the concert platform giving recitals. Her acting debut was in 1908 on the London stage at Aldwych Theatre. Her American stage debut came in Romance at Maxine Elliott's Theatre in 1913.

She took over management of the Ambassadors Theatre in 1913 and had several years experience on stage in Britain and America before her appearances in Hollywood films. Two of her three children by her first marriage in the first quarter of 1904 to Ernest J. Taylor, Ralph and Dorothy Brenda, known as Brenda, were also actors. The middle child of the three, Phyllis Mary Taylor, was not in the acting business. Her second husband was British actor Charles Quartermaine, who married in 1925; the union ended in divorce. She married her third husband, Wesley Wall, an American businessman, in 1935; the couple remained married until her death in 1974.

She became a naturalized United States citizen in 1943, with one of her character references being Lucile Webster Gleason, actress and wife of actor James Gleason.

Filmography

 Women Who Win (1919) - Ella Graham
 The Lady Clare (1919) - Lady Julia Medwin
 Nance (1920) - Felicia Damarche
 Inheritance (1920) - Lady Isabel
 Tillie the Toiler (1927) - Mrs. Fish - Pennington's Mother (uncredited)
 Her Private Life (1929) - Ladu Wildering
 Sunny Side Up (1929) - Mrs. Cromwell
 The Thirteenth Chair (1929) - Lady Crosby
 The Trespasser (1929) - Mrs. Ferguson
 Strictly Unconventional (1930) - Mrs. Anna Shenstone
 So This Is London (1930) - Lady Worthing
 Holiday (1930) - Mrs. Pritchard Ames (uncredited)
 Abraham Lincoln (1930) - Actress (uncredited)
 East Is West (1930) - Mrs. Benson
 The Devil to Pay! (1930) - Mrs. Hope (uncredited)
 The Man Who Came Back (1931) - Mrs. Gaynes
 Born to Love (1931) - The Duchess (uncredited)
 Chances (1931) - Mrs. Ingleside
 The Brat (1931) - Mrs. Mary Forrester
 Working Girls (1931) - Mrs. Johnstone
 Stepping Sisters (1932) - Mrs. Tremaine
 The Silent Witness (1932) - Lady Howard
 Vanity Fair (1932) - Mrs. Sedley
 A Farewell to Arms (1932) - Miss Van Campen
 Shock (1934) - Lady Heatherly
 Cavalcade (1933)
 he Masquerader (1933) - Duchess of Churt (uncredited)
 Bombshell (1933) - Mrs. Middleton
 You Can't Buy Everything (1934) - Kate Farley
 Carolina (1934) - Aunt Catherine (uncredited)
 Sadie McKee (1934) - Mrs. Alderson (uncredited)
 Born to Be Bad (1934) - Admirer at Nightclub (uncredited)
 The Most Precious Thing in Life (1934) - Mrs. Kelsey
 Now I'll Tell (1934) - Mrs. Drake (uncredited)
 Shock (1934) - Lady Heatherly (uncredited)
 Blind Date (1934) - Mrs. Hartwell
 She Was a Lady (1934) - Lady Diana Vane
 Oh Sailor Behave (1934 short)
 British Agent (1934) - Lady Catherine Trehearne
 A Lost Lady (1934) - Mrs. Hardy (uncredited)
 Two Heads on a Pillow (1934) - Mrs. Caroline Devonshire
 Happiness Ahead (1934) - Mrs. Travis
 Transatlantic Merry-Go-Round (1934) - Passenger Campbell Sits Next To (uncredited)
 We Live Again (1934) - Mrs. Kortchagin (uncredited)
 The Painted Veil (1934) - Mrs. Braithwaite (uncredited)
 Roberta (1935) - Mrs. Teale (uncredited)
 McFadden's Flats (1935) (uncredited)
 Laddie (1935) - Mrs. Anna Pryor
 Les Misérables (1935) - Mlle. Baptiseme
 Dizzy Dames (1935) - Mrs. Stokes
 Stranded (1935) - Grace Dean (uncredited)
 Anna Karenina (1935) - Princess Sorokina
 Rendezvous (1935) - Lady Cavendish (uncredited)
 The Perfect Gentleman (1935) - Lady Clyffe-Pembrook
 The Widow from Monte Carlo (1935) - Lady Holloway
 Captain Blood (1935) - Mrs. Steed
 The White Angel (1936) - First Lady Disapproving of Florence (uncredited)
 Wedding Present (1936) - Mrs. Dodacker
 Theodora Goes Wild (1936) - Mrs. Wyatt (uncredited)
 Women of Glamour (1937) - Mrs. Stark
 Another Dawn (1937) - Mrs. Lydia Benton
 Wee Willie Winkie (1937) - Mrs. MacMonachie
 The Life of the Party (1937) - Mrs. Saunders (uncredited)
 One Hundred Men and a Girl (1937) - Concert Hall Patron (uncredited)
 Stage Door (1937) - Cast of Stage Play
 The Awful Truth (1937) - Mrs. Vance
 What Do You Think? (Number Three) (1939 short) - Mrs. Dosier (uncredited)
 Everybody Sing (1938) - Miss Colvin
 Outside of Paradise (1938) - Mrs. Stonewall
 The Rage of Paris (1938) - Woman in Opera Box (uncredited)
 Always Goodbye (1938) - Aunt Martha Marshall
 You Can't Take It with You (1938) - Meriam Kirby, Anthony's wife
 Three Loves Has Nancy (1938) - Mrs. Hansen
 Just Around the Corner (1938) - Miss Vincent (uncredited)
 You Can't Cheat an Honest Man (1939) - Mrs. Bel-Goodie
 Fast and Loose (1939) - Mrs. Torrent
 Risky Business (1939) - Mrs. Jameson
 The Ice Follies of 1939 (1939) - Lady Hilda (uncredited)
 Three Smart Girls Grow Up (1939) - Mrs. Withers (uncredited)
 Outside These Walls (1939) - Gertrude Bishop
 The Sun Never Sets (1939) - Mrs. Randolph
 It Could Happen to You (1939) - Mrs. Quigley (uncredited)
 Should Husbands Work? (1939) - Mrs. Barnes
 I Stole a Million (1939) - Customer in Flower Shop (uncredited)
 These Glamour Girls (1939) - Mrs. Van Reichton (uncredited)
 The Adventures of Sherlock Holmes (1939) - Lady Conyngham
 Hollywood Cavalcade (1939) - Mrs. Gaynes
 Ninotchka (1939) - Lady Lavenham - Indignant Woman in Doorway (uncredited)
 Laddie (1940) - Mrs. Anna Pryor
 Florian (1940) - Grandmother (uncredited)
 Blame It on Love (1940) - Mrs. Wadsworth
 Private Affairs (1940) - Mrs. Stanley
 All This, and Heaven Too (1940) - Lady at the Theatre (uncredited)
 Girl from Avenue A (1940) - Minor Role (uncredited)
 South of Suez (1940) - Mrs. Putnam
 Back Street (1941) - Mrs. Williams (uncredited)
 When Ladies Meet (1941) - Freddie's Mother (uncredited)
 Nothing But the Truth (1941) - Mrs. Ralston
 Paris Calling (1941) - Lady Guest (uncredited)
 We Were Dancing (1942) - Mrs. Louise Sandys (uncredited)
 Klondike Fury (1942) - Lady Leslie Clayfair
 Twin Beds (1942) - (uncredited)
 This Above All (1942) - Vicar's Wife (uncredited)
 Almost Married (1942) - Mrs. Marvin
 The Great Impersonation (1942) - Lady Leslie Clayfair
 Sherlock Holmes in Washington (1943) - Mother Pettibone (uncredited)
 Mr. Lucky (1943) - War Relief Worker (uncredited)
 Two Tickets to London (1943) - Dame Dunne Hartley
 Dangerous Blondes (1943) - Isabel Fleming (uncredited)
 Flesh and Fantasy (1943) - Lady Thomas (uncredited)
 Women in Bondage (1943) - Gladys Bracken
 Jane Eyre (1943) - Mrs. Eshton (uncredited)
 What a Woman! (1943) - Senator's Wife (uncredited)
 Tender Comrade (1943) - Mrs. Flanagan - Jo's Mother (uncredited)
 Ladies Courageous (1944) - Sister Rose (uncredited)
 The Picture of Dorian Gray (1945) - Lady Agatha
 A Guy, a Gal and a Pal (1945) - Mrs. Breckenridge (uncredited)
 I'll Remember April (1945) - Mrs. Barrington
 Earl Carroll Vanities (1945) - Queen Mother Elena
 That's the Spirit (1945) - Minor Role (uncredited)
 Guest Wife (1945) - Dinner Guest (uncredited)
 Lady on a Train (1945) - Waring Cousin (uncredited)
 That Night with You (1945) - Mrs. Brock (uncredited)
 One Way to Love (1946) - Distinguished Woman (uncredited)
 Terror by Night (1946) - Lady Margaret Carstairs
 The Kid from Brooklyn (1946) - Garden Party Guest (uncredited)
 A Stolen Life (1946) - Art Patron (uncredited)
 Half-Wits Holiday (1947 short) - Countess Shpritzvasser (uncredited)
 Cigarette Girl (1947) - Mrs. Halstead
 The Other Love (1947) - Madame Gruen - Sanitarium Patient (uncredited)
 Ivy (1947) - Lady Crail (uncredited)
 The Secret Life of Walter Mitty (1947) - Mrs. Pierce (uncredited)
 Down to Earth (1947) - Mrs. Fenimore Hume (uncredited)
 Song of Love (1947) - Woman at Party (uncredited)
 The Exile (1947) - Second Court Lady
 It Had to Be You (1947) - Mrs. Kimberly (uncredited)
 The Judge Steps Out (1948) - Margaret (uncredited)
 The Black Arrow (1948) - Nun (uncredited)
 You Gotta Stay Happy (1948) - Aunt Martha
 Pest Man Wins (1951 short) - Party Guest (uncredited)
 Les Misérables (1952) - Nun (uncredited)
 Houseboat'' (1958) - British Society Woman (uncredited)

References

External links

 
 
 

1883 births
1974 deaths
English film actresses
English silent film actresses
20th-century English actresses
English theatre managers and producers
Women theatre managers and producers
British expatriate actresses in the United States
People from Hornsey
Actresses from London
20th-century English businesspeople